Michele Matera (born 2 August 1985), known professionally as Highsnob, is an Italian rapper and singer.

He participated alongside Hu at the Sanremo Music Festival 2022, with the song "Abbi cura di te".

Discography

Studio albums 
 Bipopular (2018)
 Yang (2020)

Extended plays 
 Prettyboy (2017)
 Yin (2019)

References

Italian rappers
Living people
21st-century Italian male singers
1985 births